John Viret Gooch FRSA (29 June 1812 – 8 June 1900) was the locomotive superintendent of the London and South Western Railway from 1841 to 1850. Born at Bedlington, Northumberland, John Viret Gooch (brother of Daniel Gooch) was the son of John and Anna (born Longridge).

Career

Grand Junction Railway
He became the pupil of Joseph Locke during the construction of the Grand Junction Railway and he became the resident engineer after that line opened.

Manchester and Leeds Railway
In 1840 he joined his older brother Thomas Longridge Gooch on the Manchester and Leeds Railway.

London and South Western Railway
Gooch was recommended to the LSWR by Locke and appointed locomotive superintendent on 1 January 1841. Officially Locke remained in charge of the department.

LSWR locomotives
Initially locomotives were purchased from a wide range of private manufacturers such as Edward Bury and Company and Nasmyth, Gaskell and Company. From Jan 1843 the LSWR's own Nine Elms Locomotive Works started production with the 'Eagle' class singles. Gooch's designs included a number of singles and the 'Bison' class 0-6-0 goods.

Eastern Counties Railway
After leaving the LSWR in 1850, Gooch was appointed to the post of Locomotive Superintendent to the Eastern Counties Railway. On appointment he was given a free hand by chairman Edward Ladd Betts to reduce working costs of which he would receive 2.5% of any savings made. Unfortunately there were no checks and balances in place (and nor was the move minuted), so Viret would tell the accountant what he had saved and receive his payment. The main target of his costs were the engine drivers where he would sack men and then offer them their own jobs back at a lower rate, and deduct money from their wages for late running or mechanical failure.

Betts was succeeded as chairman by David Waddington in 1851, who made himself responsible for the ECR stores committee. Gooch made an agreement with the Norfolk and Eastern Counties Coal Company which was partnership of coal merchant E and A Prior David Waddington, Samuel Morton Peto and Gooch, where they would pay him 3d (3 old UK pennies) per ton purchased. Viret would then sell some of the ECR coal on for further personal gain.

On 12 August 178 drivers, firemen and fitters handed in their notices, sick of the injustices and financial penalties being inflicted on them and in the hope that Gooch would be forced to resign. The board backed Gooch and the 178 men were blacklisted from future railway employment with replacement staff being recruited from other railway companies.

Gooch stayed at the ECR until 1856 when the shareholders finally worked out what was going on and both he and Waddington did not have their contracts renewed. At this point, he would only have been aged 44 and according to his obituary printed in the journal of the Institution of Civil Engineers "he did little practical work during the past forty years, enjoying country life in his Berkshire home".

ECR locomotives
Under Viret's tenure at the ECR six classes of locomotive were introduced including the first locomotive actually built at Stratford Works in 1851.  The classes were as follows:

Shipping Interests
Gooch had interest in six ships (all colliers) and he was guilty of using ECR facilities at Lowestoft to repair his own ships.

The six ships were:

 Lady Berriedale - built John Scott Russell London in 1853, sunk 1868.
 The Eagle - built John Scott Russell in 1853, sunk 1870
 The Falcon (1)- built John Scott Russell in 1853 - wrecked off Lesbos in 1856 on its return from the Crimean War
 The Hawk - built John Scott Russell in 1854 - lost in a gale off Southwold in 1862
 The Vulcan - built James Laing, Sunderland in 1856. Sold August 1886 to Captain Edward Jenkins of Cardiff and sunk in Carbis Bay in 1894
 The Falcon (2) - built M Samuelson and Sons, Hull in 1862, but lost at sea in 1868 off Spain.

He was also a director for The Australian Auxiliary Steam Clipper Company, Ltd.

Mining interests 
He was a director for several mining companies including:
 Copper Queen United, Ltd.
 La Trinidad, Ltd.
 Mounts Bay Consols, Ltd.
 Tresavean Mines, Ltd.

Family
J. V. Gooch was married twice. First, in June 1840, to Hannah Frances Handcock, daughter of Captain Elias Robinson Handcock. Secondly, on 16 March 1876, to Emily Mary Stonhouse, daughter of Reverend Charles Stonhouse. J. V. Gooch lived at Cooper's Hill, Bracknell, Berkshire.

His eldest child from his second marriage, Mabel Barbara, who was born in 1877. His son was Edward Sinclair Gooch (1879-1915) who was a major in the Berkshire Yeomanry and killed in World War 1. He also had a second daughter named Ethel Mary who was born in 1882.

Notes

References

 

1812 births
English railway mechanical engineers
British railway pioneers
Locomotive builders and designers
Locomotive superintendents
London and South Western Railway people
1900 deaths
19th-century British engineers
People from Bedlington
19th-century British businesspeople